The Sasse Museum of Art, formerly known as the Inland Empire Museum of Art (IEMA), was founded 2015 in as a nonprofit art museum located in Upland, California. The museum relies on donations and public support.

History
In 2015 the museum was in search of a permanent location. The museum sought a location near Rancho Cucamonga because of its proximity to Los Angeles. The museum eventually found a location in Upland California. It is now based in Pomona, California, part of the Inland Empire, a metropolitan area situated directly east of the Los Angeles metropolitan area.

The museum in 2022 has moved to Pomona at 300 South Thomas Street; Pomona California 91766 located in the Progress Building in the basement level.

References

External links
Sasse Museum of Art

Museums established in 2015
Museums in San Bernardino County, California
Art museums and galleries in California
Museums of American art
Contemporary art galleries in the United States